Lomevactone (INN) (developmental code name DR-250) is a drug described as a psychostimulant and antidepressant which was synthesized and assayed in the 1980s but was never marketed.

Conformation
Another cas number is [75115-73-0]

It is the (3R,4R,6R)-form [82510-81-4] that contains the psychotherapeutic properties.

(Although the SSS isomer is depicted in the referenced diagram)

Synthesis

The conjugate 1,4-alkylation reaction between 4-chlorobenzylideneacetone [3160-40-5] (1) and phenylacetonitrile [140-29-4] (2) gives 3-(4-chlorophenyl)-5-oxo-2-phenylhexanenitrile, CID:333058 (3). The selective reduction of the keto group to the alcohol with sodium borohydride gives 3-(4-chlorophenyl)-5-hydroxy-2-phenylhexanenitrile, CID:12754889 (4). Hydrolysis of the nitrile to an acid would give 3-(4-Chlorophenyl)-5-hydroxy-2-phenylhexanoic acid, CID:3058345. This is followed by the  concomitant lactone formation completing the synthesis of Lomevactone (5).

References

2-Pyrones
Antidepressants
Chloroarenes
Stimulants
Abandoned drugs